Maurice Favre (1876 – 1954) was a French dermatologist who gave his name to Durand-Nicolas-Favre disease, Gamna-Favre bodies and Favre–Racouchot syndrome.

External links 
 

French dermatologists
1876 births
1954 deaths